BLIS/COBOL is a discontinued operating system that was written in COBOL. It is the only such system to gain reasonably wide acceptance. It was optimised to compile business applications written in COBOL.  BLIS was available on a range of Data General Nova and Data General Eclipse 16-bit minicomputers. It was marketed by Information Processing, Inc. (IPI), who regularly exhibited the product at the National Computer Conference in the 1970s and 80s. It was priced between US$830 and $10,000 depending on the number of supported users and features. In 1977, IPI boasted over 100 operational installations of the system worldwide.

By 1985, a version for the IBM PC existed called PC-BLIS.

Originally, most operating systems were written in assembly language for a particular processor or family of processors.  Non-assembler operating systems were comparatively slow, but were easier for revision and repair.  One of the reasons for the C programming language's low-level features, which resemble assembly language in some ways, is an early intent to use it for writing operating systems.  Similar goals led to IBM's development of PL/S.  The high-level nature of COBOL, which created some problems for operating system development, was partially addressed in BLIS, since it was deliberately optimized for COBOL.

References 

Discontinued operating systems
COBOL
Assembly language software